Tazeh Kand-e Janizeh (also Romanized as Tāzeh Kand-e Janīzeh) is a village in Nazluchay Rural District, Nazlu District, Urmia County, West Azerbaijan Province, Iran. At the 2006 census, its population was 234, in 62 families.

References 

Populated places in Urmia County